The 2023 UMass Dartmouth Corsairs football team will represent the University of Massachusetts Dartmouth as a member of the Massachusetts State Collegiate Athletic Conference (MASCAC) during the 2023 NCAA Division III football season. The Corsairs, led by 1st-year head coach Josh Sylvester, will play their home games at Cressy Field in Dartmouth, Massachusetts.

Previous season

The Corsairs finished the 2022 season with a record of 9–2 (8–0 in the MASCAC). They finished in first place. UMass Dartmouth started the season unranked and did not receive any rankings throughout the season. The team won the MASCAC and made an appearance in the 2022 Division III playoffs where they lost 20–63 against Ithaca. Head coach Mark Robichaud announced his retirement after the season.

The team finished the 2022 season unranked.

Schedule

Game summaries

at Nichols

Curry

at Framingham State

Worcester State

at Western Connecticut State

Massachusetts Maritime

at Westfield State

Fitchburg State

at Bridgewater State

Plymouth State

References

UMass Dartmouth
UMass Dartmouth Corsairs football seasons
UMass Dartmouth Corsairs football